Cloak of Deception is a 2001 novel set in the Star Wars galaxy. It is a prequel novel occurring before the events of Star Wars: Episode I – The Phantom Menace. The book was written by James Luceno. The cover art was by Steven Anderson. The book takes place 32.5 years before Star Wars: Episode IV – A New Hope.
Narration for the audio version was performed by Alexander Adams. The paperback version included a 15-page excerpt of Enemy Lines: Rebel Dream.

Synopsis
The Galactic Republic is in a state of decline, mired in greed and corruption and tangled in bureaucracy. In the outlying systems, where the Trade Federation maintains a stranglehold on shipping routes, tensions are boiling over—while back in the comfort of Coruscant, the hub of civilized space and seat of Republic government, few senators seem inclined to investigate the problem. And those who suspect Supreme Chancellor Valorum of having a hand in the machinations are baffled—especially when Jedi Master Qui-Gon Jinn and his apprentice Obi-Wan Kenobi foil an assassination attempt on the Chancellor.

With the crisis escalating, Valorum calls for an emergency trade summit. As humans and aliens gather, conspiracies sealed with large sums of money run rampant, and no one is entirely above suspicion. But the greatest threat of all remains unknown to everyone except three members of the Trade Federation, who have entered into a shadowy alliance with the Sith lord Darth Sidious. While Valorum, Qui-Gon and Obi-Wan will be content with more money and fewer problems, Sidious has grander, far more terrifying plans.

Writing
While writing the novel, Luceno was granted access to parts of the screenplay drafts and concept art of Star Wars: Episode II – Attack of the Clones. As such, Cloak of Deception marked the first appearance in the series' chronological timeline of almost all of the new characters from Attack of the Clones, including the Techno Union, and other Separatists.

Opening crawl
The back cover of the book features an opening crawl similar to those at the beginning of the Star Wars films:

External links
 Amazon.com Listing
 Official CargoBay Listing
 

2001 science fiction novels
Star Wars Legends novels
Prequel novels
Del Rey books
Novels by James Luceno